Centenary United Methodist Church is a historic Methodist church located in Richmond, Virginia. The Gothic Revival building was completed in 1843. A simple brick building it was initially designed by John and Samuel Freeman before receiving a major expansion in the 1870s according to designs by Richmond architect Albert L. West. It is located at 411 East Grace Street.

It was added to the National Register of Historic Places on December 28, 1979.  It is located in the Grace Street Commercial Historic District.

See also
National Register of Historic Places listings in Richmond, Virginia

References

External links
Centenary United Methodist Church website

19th-century Methodist church buildings in the United States
Churches in Richmond, Virginia
Methodist churches in Virginia
Gothic Revival church buildings in Virginia
Churches completed in 1843
National Register of Historic Places in Richmond, Virginia
Churches on the National Register of Historic Places in Virginia
Individually listed contributing properties to historic districts on the National Register in Virginia
1843 establishments in Virginia